Kamalak is a children's organization is an organization under the Youth Union of Uzbekistan, which implements and unites social projects aimed at supporting the talents and talents of students from ten to eighteen years of age based on the principles of voluntariness, transparency, equality of rights and obligations.

The main goal of the organization's activities is to educate children as loyal children of the Motherland and perfect human beings based on the national ideal, to express and protect their rights and interests, to create conditions for them to show and develop their talents and abilities.

Rights 
The organization carries out its activities on the basis of the Constitution and laws of the Republic of Uzbekistan, the "Convention on the Rights of the Child", the Charter of the Youth Union of Uzbekistan and the organization's charter. The organization has its structures in the Republic of Karakalpakstan, all regions, Tashkent cities.

Motto 
The main motto of the organization is: "For the homeland, friendship and happy childhood."

International cooperation 
Active members of the "Kamalak" children's organization took part in the international cultural and educational forum "Children of the Commonwealth" in the Kyrgyz Republic on June 26-5.

Projects 
Every year under the motto of the organization "For the Motherland, Friendship and Happy Childhood" the captains increase their social activity through mutual friendship, exchange of experience, support, skills of working with young people, further development of their creative and intellectual abilities, leadership and initiative. A traditional conference is held in order to publicize the abilities and achievements and best practices, strengthen leadership skills and increase their activity, support their activities, popularize best practices, and encourage the most active captains. Within the framework of the conference, the Republican stages of such contests as "Captain of the Year", "Council of the Most Exemplary Regional Captains" and "'Kamalak' Connoisseurs" will be held.

Privileges 
Decision No. 914 of the Cabinet of Ministers of the Republic of Uzbekistan "On granting privileges to active members of the Youth Union of Uzbekistan in entering higher education institutions". Active captains of the "Kamalak" children's organization can also use this privilege.

References 

Educational organisations based in Uzbekistan
Organizations established in 2001